Samantha Luzia Joseph Lobatto (born 23 September 1988 in) is an Indian cricketer. She is a right-handed batter and right-arm off-break bowler who normally keeps wicket. She played 3 ODIs and 3 T20I for India women's cricket team all in 2011.

References

Living people
1988 births
India women One Day International cricketers
India women Twenty20 International cricketers
West Zone women cricketers
Railways women cricketers
Mumbai women cricketers
Hyderabad women cricketers
Cricketers from Mumbai
Wicket-keepers